The La Salle Theater was an influential musical, vaudevillian and dramatic playhouse in two Chicago locations, first at 137 West Madison Street, which, until December 1902, had been named the Orpheon Music Hall. The La Salle operated at that location until 1910. Then it moved into a new facility at 110 West Madison, operating as playhouse until 1927, when film began to predominate. The theater closed in the late 1940s. In the spring of 1950, the building was razed to make way for St. Peter's Church.

Tenants & owners 
The original La Salle was owned by Anna Sinton Taft, wife the Charles Phelps Taft, who was the brother of U.S. President William Howard Taft. The tenant, from about 1903 until 1910, was Mort H. Singer; in 1910, after lengthy legal action, the theater was won by Harry Askin (1864–1934) and the La Salle Opera House Company, composed of Charles W. Murphy, owner of the Chicago Cubs, Askin and several other minor associates.

In June 1917, Sinton sold the La Salle (from 118 to 116 West Madison) to S. W. Strauss & Co., headed by Albert L. Strauss (1871–1918). In 1927, La Salle began showing movies. It closed in the late 1940s. In the spring of 1950, the building was razed to make way for St. Peter's Church. In 1913, The La Salle Theater was one of 36 Chicago theaters listed in the Chicago Daily News Almanac and Year-Book of 1914.

Selected productions 
 The Umpire (1905), book and lyrics by Will Millan Hough (né William M. Hough; 1882–1962) & Frank R. Adams, music by Joseph E. Howard
 300 performances
 The Girl Question, by Joseph E. Howard, Frank R. Adams, and Will Hough
 Opening night: August 17, 1907
 Over 100 performances
 The Sweetest Girl from Paris (1910), book and lyrics by Addison Burkhardt (1879–1937) & Collin Davis, music by Joseph E. Howard
 Ran successfully for two years
 Louisiana Lou, by Addison Burkhardt, Frederick Donaghey, and Ben Jerome
 Opening night: September 3, 1912
 265 performances

Former managers 
 Mort H. Singer (né Mortimer Henry Singer; 1876–1944), who, in addition to managing the La Salle beginning around 1906, produced and directed musicals, many of which toured. He went on to simultaneously manage many other theaters. He led more than one production, but the original one that performed at La Salle was named "La Salle Theater Stock Company."

References
General references
 Programs for the La Salle Theatre, 
 Programs, unbound and arranged by years, 1907–1927 
 Midwest Theater and Concert Programs, Playbills, etc. 

Inline citations

Theatres in Chicago
Buildings and structures demolished in 1950
Demolished buildings and structures in Chicago